Augustine Skinner (c. 1594 – 11 June 1672) was an English politician who sat in the House of Commons variously between 1642 and 1659. He took the Parliamentary side during the English Civil War.

Skinner was of Tutsham Hall at West Farleigh in Kent and belonged to a newly arrived rather than established Kent family (his ancestors being from Devon). In 1642, he was elected Member of Parliament member for Kent the Long Parliament.  He supported parliament in the Civil War and was sufficiently orthodox in his support to survive Pride's Purge. He refused to accept appointment as a Commissioner in the trial of the King. After the expulsion of the Rump Parliament he represented Kent again in the Parliament of 1654, and in the restored Rump in 1659. He was an active Justice of the Peace throughout the Commonwealth period, and it was said that Cromwell had great confidence in him as a magistrate.

Skinner borrowed money to buy two manors which had been confiscated from the Bishop of Rochester; when these were restored to their original ownership at the Restoration, he found himself heavily in debt. His brother William was in similar difficulties, and together they procured a private Act of Parliament in 1660 to allow them to sell other lands to raise funds, Skinner's seat at Tutsham Hall being sold to one Edward Goulston. Skinner was still unable to meet his obligations and, being arrested for debt, he eventually died in the Fleet Prison in 1672, aged 78. He was buried at West Farleigh.

Skinner made two good marriages, to Elizabeth Twisden, daughter of Serjeant-at-Law Richard Braithwaite, and to Ann Franklin, daughter of Thomas Franklin, an Alderman of the City of London; but his only son, also called Augustine (born 1618), lived less than a year, so that his heir was his brother, William.

References

D. Brunton & D. H. Pennington, Members of the Long Parliament (London: George Allen & Unwin, 1954)
Cobbett's Parliamentary history of England, from the Norman Conquest in 1066 to the year 1803 (London: Thomas Hansard, 1808) 
 Mark Noble, Lives of the English Regicides (London: John Stockdale, 1798) 

1590s births
1672 deaths
Inmates of Fleet Prison
English MPs 1640–1648
English MPs 1648–1653
English MPs 1654–1655
People from West Farleigh